Salsa e Merengue is a Brazilian telenovela produced and broadcast at the 7pm timeslot by TV Globo, from September 30, 1996 to May 2, 1997, in 177 episodes.

It is written by Miguel Falabella and Maria Carmem Barbosa, with text supervision of Gilberto Braga and directed by Wolf Maya.

The telenovela stars Patrícia França, Marcos Palmeira, Marcello Antony, Débora Bloch, Victor Fasano, Laura Cardoso, Arlete Salles, Bia Nunnes, José D'Artagnan Júnior, Rosamaria Murtinho, Walmor Chagas and Cristiana Oliveira in the main roles.

Plot 
A rich woman named Bárbara gives birth to a dead child, however without her knowledge, her husband Guilherme exchanges the child's body for a baby whose mother is poor and cannot afford to raise the child. 30 years later, Eugênio, the exchanged child, develops leukemia and is in need of an urgent marrow transplant. The donation of a blood relative is required for the surgery and with the risk of his son dying, Guilherme tells Bárbara about the exchange. The two go in search of Anabel Muñoz, Eugênio’s birth mother.

Anabel never told anyone about the pregnancy, but never forgot the son she had with Urbano. Anabel later met her late husband Félix Munõz, with whom she had five other children: Valentim, Remédios , Amparo, Assunção, and Antônio. With Eugênio’s reappearance in her life, Anabel is forced reveal the truth. Eugênio, who thought he was the son of millionaires, discovers that his real family is poor. The tests show that Anabel’s bone marrow is incompatible with Eugênio. Because of this, Anabel reveals another secret: Valentim is also Urbano's son. Valentim is faced with the situation of having to donate bone marrow for a brother he doesn’t know. To make matters worse, Eugene and Valentim fall in love with the same woman, Madalena.

Cast 
Patrícia França as Madalena Sobral
Marcos Palmeira as Valentim Muñoz
Marcello Antony as Eugênio Amarante Paes
Cristiana Oliveira as Adriana Campos Queiroz
Zezé Polessa as Marinelza Bolla
Laura Cardoso as Ruth Campos Queiroz
Cláudio Cavalcanti as Dr. Olavo
Ariclê Perez as Gilda Campos Queiroz
Bia Nunnes as Remédios Muñoz
Thaís de Campos as Amparo Muñoz
Gabriela Alves as Assunção Muñoz
Diogo Vilela as Caio Graco Leão
Rosi Campos as Dayse Menezes
André Gonçalves as Walter
Maria Maya as Caroline "Kelly" Bolla
Juliana Baroni as Inês Soares da Cunha
Ricardo Petraglia as Tito Soares da Cunha
Mônica Torres as Lídia
Jacqueline Laurence as Eglantine Billard
Stella Miranda as Maria do Socorro
Marcos Oliveira as Cândido "Candinho"
Ademir Zanyor Jair "Jairzinho" Billard
Estelita Bell as Imaculada Muñoz
Maria Lúcia Dahl as Laís Soares da Cunha
José D'Artagnan Júnior as Edgar
Chico Díaz as Ramiro Morales
Maria Gladys as Neném
Luís Salém as Lázaro
Angela Rebello as Tereza
Regiana Antonini as Deusa
Mara Manzan as Sexta-Feira
Alexandre Barillari as Antônio Muñoz
Adriana Garambone as Clarice Amarante Paes
Johnny Rudge as Moacir "Moa" Menezes 
Bruno Murtinho as Wellington
Zezeh Barbosa as Jacinta
Vanessa Dantas as Flávia
Adriano Garib as Juarez
Débora Bloch as Teodora Bentes do Gama
Victor Fasano as Heitor Lobato
Marcos Paulo as Gaspar Junqueira
Nelson Xavier as Mestre Bento Sobral

Special guest stars 
Arlete Salles as Anabel Muñoz
Rosamaria Murtinho as Bárbara Amarante Paes
Walmor Chagas as Guilherme Amarante Paes
Oswaldo Loureiro as Walmir Bolla

References

External links

1996 Brazilian television series debuts
1997 Brazilian television series endings
1996 telenovelas
TV Globo telenovelas
Brazilian telenovelas
Portuguese-language telenovelas